Iain Angus Vigurs (born 7 May 1988) is a Scottish footballer who plays as a midfielder for Scottish League One club Cove Rangers. He has previously played for Elgin City, Inverness Caledonian Thistle, Ross County and Motherwell.

Early life
Born in Aberdeen, Vigurs attended Mackie Academy in Stonehaven, where he lived before his footballing career began.

Club career

Early career
Vigurs played for Stonehaven Youth under 9s, scoring over 50 goals in his only season. Vigurs started his playing career in the youth team of Aberdeen and then was signed by Celtic. However, Vigurs left Celtic when he was fourteen. He quoted: "When I left Celtic I felt like I had failed a little bit."

Vigurs played for Elgin City in the Third Division, playing over 20 times since making his debut at age 15. Since joining, Vigurs quoted "I played for a boys club for a season then went to Elgin when I was 15. I loved every minute and gained some good experience playing in the Third Division."

Inverness Caledonian Thistle
He then signed for Inverness Caledonian Thistle, where he was given a twelve-month professional contract and then signed a one-year contract extension with Caley Thistle in May 2008.

He made his home debut for Inverness Caledonian Thistle in May 2008 in a 6–1 win over Gretna. He assisted Ross Tokely's goal and then a minute later scored a goal with a volley. In the 2008–09 season, Vigurs first team opportunities were limited under managers Craig Brewster and Terry Butcher; which saw Inverness relegated to Scottish Division One. He did however manage to score twice, with goals against Arbroath in the League Cup and Partick Thistle in the Scottish Cup. In December 2008, the club offered him a new contract following his breakthrough into the first team, however at the end of the season, it was announced he was among seven players to leave the club. While at Inverness, Vigurs was "criticised for his laid back approach".

Ross County
Following his release from Inverness, Vigurs joined Highland rivals Ross County on a one-year contract.

Vigurs made his debut in the opening game of the season, in a 2–1 win over Airdrie United. Vigurs scored a back heel against his old club (Inverness Caledonian Thistle) in his first Highland Derby which Ross County won 3–1. Because of his good performances, he was named SFL Young Player of the Month for August 2009. Vigurs would add two more goals against Dunfermline Athletic in two different matches. In the Scottish Cup quarter-final replay against Hibernian, Vigurs provided an assist for Scott Boyd to score a last minute goal in a 2–1 win. Ross County went on to reach the final, however they lost 3–0 to Dundee United.

In the 2010–11 season, Vigurs began the season on the substitutes bench. He scored his first goal of the season in a 1–1 draw against Queen of the South and he scored again in a 2–0 win against the same opponents in the final of the Scottish Challenge Cup, Vigurs scored the second goal in the match. Then in the 2011–12 season, Vigurs made thirty five appearances and scored five times as Ross County won the First Division title and we're promoted to the Scottish Premier League for the first time in the club's history. At the end of the 2011–12 season, Vigurs signed a new one-year contract with the club.

Vigurs played his first Scottish Premier League match in three years, as Ross County drew 0–0 against Motherwell in the opening game of the season. Vigurs would score in three straights matches between 29 September 2012 and 20 October 2012 against St Mirren, Inverness Caledonian Thistle and Hibernian. Following his first goal of the 2012–13 season against St Mirren, Vigurs described the match as "It was just a freak match. It ended up turning into a basketball game." Vigurs continuously established himself in the first team at Ross County and would add nine goals to his tally in thirty nine appearances in all competitions. He scored with a free-kick in a 1–1 draw against Celtic on 5 May 2013.

At the end of the 2012–13 season, with his contract about to expire, Vigurs was linked with St Johnstone and Hibernian. During his career, Vigurs referred to himself as "Ross County's Mario Balotelli", due to his training-ground eruptions and occasional crazy behavior.

Motherwell
After a move to English League One side Oldham Athletic collapsed, Vigurs signed a two-year deal with fellow SPL club Motherwell, on 12 June 2013.

Vigurs made his Motherwell debut in the first leg of the third qualifying round of the Europa League, in a 2–0 loss against Kuban Krasnodar. Motherwell would be eliminated after Kuban Krasnodar proved to be too strong and failed to win either leg losing 2–0 and 1–0 respectively. Vigurs made his league debut in the opening game of the season, in a 1–0 win over Hibernian. Vigurs contributed plenty of assists to the club, but was unable to score his first goal, that was until 1 January 2014 where Motherwell won 4–0 against St Johnstone. Vigurs' second goal came on 1 March 2014, in a 4–1 win over Hearts. Vigurs then scored two goals in two matches against Kilmarnock and Inverness Caledonian Thistle In his first season at Motherwell, Vigurs made thirty-seven appearances and scored four times in all competitions, as he helped the club finish in second place.

In his second season at Motherwell, Vigurs started his season well when he set up one of Josh Law's goal, in the Europa League second qualifying round 1st leg match against Stjarnan at Fir Park. He then scored his first goal of the season on 13 September 2014, in a 2–1 win over Ross County. Two months later on 7 November 2014, Vigurs scored his second goal of the season, in a 1–0 win over Dundee United. However, Vigurs ended his season with fifteen appearances, scoring twice in all competitions after suffering from a sciatic problem that kept him out for the remainder of the season.

On 2 June 2015, Motherwell announced that Vigurs was amongst the players leaving the club, with his contract having expired.

Inverness Caledonian Thistle (second spell)
Following his release by Motherwell, Vigurs went on trial at Barnsley. He then played twice as a trialist for Inverurie Loco Works in the Highland Football League.

On 12 August 2015, Vigurs signed for Inverness Caledonian Thistle a second time, agreeing a one-year contract. He made his second debut the same day, as a substitute in a 0–0 draw at home against Partick Thistle.

Ross County (second spell)
On 15 May 2018, Vigurs agreed to sign for Ross County again ahead of the 2018–19 season. County won promotion back to the Scottish Premiership in Vigurs first season back at the club. On 27 May 2021 Vigurs was released from Ross County along with nine other players. Vigurs criticized the way in which he and other players were released from the club, criticizing new manager Malky Mackay for not even telling Vigurs he was released himself.

International career
Vigurs has represented Scotland at under-19 level.

Personal life
In June 2009, Vigurs, along with his brother Patrick, was charged "with initiating an alleged racially aggravated street attack". In August 2010, the pair were cleared of committing a racial attack in the incident which took place outside an Aberdeen nightclub.

In May 2013, Vigurs became a first-time father, which was the reason his move to Oldham broke down.

In the early hours of 3 February 2019, Vigurs was arrested and charged following a violent incident outside Johnny Foxes, a popular pub in Inverness.

Career statistics

Honours

Club
Ross County
Scottish First Division: 2011–12, 2018–19
Scottish Challenge Cup: 2010–11, 2018–19
Inverness CT
Scottish Challenge Cup: 2017–18

Individual
 PFA Scotland Team of the Year (Championship): 2017–18

References

External links
 Iain Vigurs profile at Motherwell FC official website
 (Elgin, not correct)
 (ICT & Ross County, not correct for ICT)

Living people
Scottish footballers
1988 births
Footballers from Aberdeen
Scotland youth international footballers
Association football midfielders
Aberdeen F.C. players
Celtic F.C. players
Elgin City F.C. players
Inverness Caledonian Thistle F.C. players
Ross County F.C. players
Motherwell F.C. players
Inverurie Loco Works F.C. players
Scottish Football League players
Scottish Premier League players
Scottish Professional Football League players
Highland Football League players
Cove Rangers F.C. players